Michael Kinsella (born 1945) is an Irish former hurling coach, selector, Gaelic games administrator and player who played as a centre-back at senior level for the Wexford county team.

References

1954 births
Living people
Buffer's Alley hurlers
Gaelic games administrators
Hurling selectors
Wexford inter-county hurlers